Clement Philip Ricardo Allicock is a Jamaican career diplomat who served as Jamaican envoy to Japan, Australia, India, Indonesia, Korea, Malaysia, New Zealand and the Philippines.

Career 
Allicock began his diplomatic career with Jamaican Ministry of Foreign Affairs and Foreign Trade in 2001 and in 2002 was appointed as Consul General to the Southern United States, based in Miami.   Between 2008 and 2012 , he was assigned to the Ministry of Foreign Affairs and Foreign Trade of Jamaica as Chief of Protocol, after which he was appointed Director of Bilateral Relations.  In 2013, he was assigned to Tokyo as Ambassador to Japan with concurrent ambassadorial appointments to Indonesia, Korea and the Philippines.  He also served as High Commissioner of Jamaica to Australia, India, Malaysia and New Zealand until 2020.  In 2021, Ambassador Allicock was appointed Director of Diplomatic Protocol at the Ministry of Foreign Affairs and Foreign Trade of Jamaica.  He subsequently served as Chief of Protocol of Jamaica from 2008 to 2012. In 2012 he was appointed Director of Bilateral Relations in the Ministry of Foreign Affairs and Foreign Trade and in 2013 was appointed Jamaican ambassador to Japan. He was later appointed High Commissioner of Jamaica to India upon presentation of his Letter of Credence to Indian president Shri Pranab Mukherjee Rashtrapati Bhavan on 21 October 2014 and also has concurrent non-resident postings as Ambassador to the Philippines, Korea and Indonesia, while also serving as non-resident High Commissioner to Malaysia, New Zealand and Australia.  Ambassador Allicock returned to the Ministry of Foreign Affairs from Japan in 2020 and in 2021 was appointed Director of Diplomatic Protocol.

References 

Jamaican diplomats